Osan Station is a train station on the Gyeongbu Line, and is also served by Seoul Subway Line 1. This is the main station in the city of Osan. There are many shops and restaurants located just outside the station. There is a bus terminal located next to the station and many local buses stop in front of the station. The name of the station was named after the area's surrounding area.

References

Seoul Metropolitan Subway stations
Railway stations in Gyeonggi Province
Railway stations in Korea opened in 1905
Metro stations in Osan